Hickory Creek is a tributary of Hickory Run rising in Mahoning County, Ohio, and meets it confluence at Hickory Run's 8.00 river mile.

References

Rivers of Mahoning County, Ohio
Rivers of Lawrence County, Pennsylvania